Automobiles Gonfaronnaises Sportives (also known as AGS and Gonfaron Sports Cars) was a small French racecar constructor that competed in various racing categories over a period of thirty years, including Formula One from  to .

AGS survived as a prosperous Formula One driving school, in Le Luc, near Gonfaron.

Foundation
The team was founded by the French mechanic, Henri Julien, who ran a filling station, the "Garage de l'Avenir", in Gonfaron, a provincial French village. In the late 1950s and early 1960s, Julien regularly attended racing events in minor classes. Although not an outstanding driver, the technical knowledge he gained eventually prompted him to start constructing racing cars.

First car
Julien's first car, the AGS JH1, saw the light of day in 1969. It was a small single-seater, intended for the category of "Formule France". The car was designed by Julien's former apprentice, the Belgian mechanic Christian Vanderpleyn, who had been with the garage (and the racing team) since the very late 1950s and who would stay on until 1988. Soon, AGS went progressed and manufactured its own Formula 3 cars, which were ambitious but not good enough to compete seriously with the state-of-art Martinis which dominated the series at the time.

Formula 2
AGS took another step ahead in 1978 when the team started competing in the European Formula 2 Championship. Still, the car - by now the AGS JH15 - was self-penned (by Vanderpleyn), self-built and self-run. Formula 2 was a difficult task for the small team, racing 1978 and 1979 without scoring any championship points. The early 1980s were somewhat better. AGS was one of the few teams who ran its own cars (Maurer, Minardi and Merzario were the others), and eventually the team was able to score points regularly. Soon some victories came, too. AGS made history when works driver Philippe Streiff won the final race of Formula 2 in 1984, using an AGS JH19C.

Formula 3000
In 1985, AGS switched to Formula 3000 with the JH20, based on the Duqueine VG4 Formula 3 chassis. The JH20 used a Cosworth DFV engine supplied through the Swiss tuning firm Mader.
Results were mediocre in 1985 and 1986.

Formula One

Beginnings
By late summer , AGS entered the Italian Grand Prix in Monza, its very first Formula One race. Its structure was somewhat bizarre: The team had no more than 7 employees and was still operated from the Garage de l'Avenir in Gonfaron.

AGS appeared with a car that was once again penned by Vanderpleyn. The JH21C was a strange mixture between former AGS F3000 vehicles and Renault F1 parts which were used extensively. The car was powered by a well-used Motori Moderni turbo engine (the only time these Carlo Chiti-developed engines were given to a customer team) and driven by Italian Ivan Capelli. A few weeks before, the car had been tested at Paul Ricard by Didier Pironi, driving an F1 car for the first time since his leg-breaking accident in the 1982 German Grand Prix.  Due to technical difficulties, neither in its first attempt nor in the following race in Portugal did Capelli see the finish.

The car was initially driven by Pascal Fabre, who had driven for the team in Formula 2 in 1982. He proved to be a reliable driver, finishing eight of the first nine races, but was never in serious contention for scoring points and failed to qualify on three occasions. AGS improved in the last two races of the season when Fabre was replaced by the Brazilian Roberto Moreno (who saw his first chance in Formula One since 1982 when he had failed to qualify a Lotus works car). In Adelaide, Moreno scored the first championship point for AGS, which meant that the team finished the season equal on points with the better-financed Ligier and the returning March team.

Takeover

In , AGS started with a new car, the JH23, and Philippe Streiff as the team's only driver. Streiff drove quite powerfully and qualified well, but he saw the chequered flag only four times; in all the other events of that year technical failures or accidents were recorded. Financially, the year started well and ended with a disaster. AGS had a solid sponsor - the French Bouygues group - which promised to support not only the racing activity but also the completion of a new factory outside Gonfaron. After AGS had started work on the new facility, Bouygues withdrew from the team, leaving Julien without any support. To save the team, he eventually had to sell it to Cyril de Rouvre, a French entrepreneur with various ambitions.

Difficulties
Things went soon from bad to worse. The new team management changed frequently (Vanderpleyn for instance went to Coloni) and brought a lot of disorder. Worse was to come; Streiff was paralysed in a testing accident in Brazil before the  season.

He was replaced with Gabriele Tarquini,  
who surprised with some great performances in the first half of the season. He was very close to the points in both the 1989 Monaco Grand Prix and 1989 United States Grand Prix, but retired in both races. Then things went better in the 1989 Mexican Grand Prix, where he finished sixth and scored his first point. But after these highlights, the team was never able to be as competitive again.

In the second part of the 1989 season, the team had to prequalify - a task that was nearly never achieved by Gabriele Tarquini and Yannick Dalmas. AGS then finished 15th in the Constructors' Championship, equal with the Lolas used by the Larrousse team. During the summer months, there were strong rumours that AGS would soon use a new W12 engine developed by the French designer Guy Nègre. This strange MGN (Moteurs Guy Nègre) machine saw the light of day in late 1988 and was tested in an old AGS JH22 chassis in the summer of 1989. It was clear that AGS was not related to these tests; they were completely private attempts by Nègre. The engine never found its way to a Grand Prix but it was announced to be used in a 1990 Le Mans car called Norma M6. The car was presented and attempted to race, but failed to qualify over engine issues.

That year brought no improvement at all, Dalmas's 9th in the 1990 Spanish Grand Prix was the best result and by the beginning of the  season the team was obviously close to its end. The team lacked money. (At the first Grand Prix  of 1991 in Phoenix the team didn't even have the money to buy lunch, and the staff had to pay for it out of their own pocket.). In the race itself, Tarquini finished 8th, which was the last finish ever of an AGS car. De Rouvre sold his team to some Italian entrepreneurs, Patrizio Cantù and Gabriele Rafanelli. Both changed little except for the driver line-up (Stefan Johansson was replaced with newcomer Fabrizio Barbazza) and the colours of the car (which were now blue, red and yellow instead of white). A new car, the JH27, was raced in the early autumn, but by then the team was in rags again, so the Italians closed the doors after the 1991 Spanish Grand Prix.

Complete Formula One results
(key)

References

External links 

AGS Formule 1
Chequered Flag Motorsport's profile of AGS

Formula One constructors
Formula One entrants
Formula Two entrants
French auto racing teams
French racecar constructors
International Formula 3000 teams
1969 establishments in France
1991 disestablishments in France
Auto racing teams established in 1969
Auto racing teams disestablished in 1991